"Under My Thumb" is a song recorded by the English rock band the Rolling Stones. Written by Mick Jagger and Keith Richards, "Under My Thumb" features a marimba played by Brian Jones. Although it was never released as a single in English-speaking countries, it is one of the band's more popular songs from the late 1960s and appears on several best-of compilations, such as Hot Rocks 1964–1971. It was included as the fourth track on both the American and United Kingdom versions of the band's 1966 studio album Aftermath.

The group frequently performed "Under My Thumb" on their 1981 US Tour and 1982 European tour as the opening number at each concert.

It was the song being performed by the group at the Altamont Free Concert in December 1969 during which the death of Meredith Hunter took place.

Lyrics and music
Like many of the songs from the Aftermath period, "Under My Thumb" uses more novel instrumentation than that featured on previous Stones records. Fuzz bass lines were added by Bill Wyman. Marimba riffs, played by Brian Jones, provide the song's most prominent hook.

The song is said to be an examination of a sexual power struggle, in which Jagger's lyrics celebrate the success of finally having controlled and gained leverage over a previously pushy, dominating woman. Savouring the successful "taming of the shrew" and comparing the woman in question to a "pet", a "Siamese cat" and a "squirming dog", the lyrics provoked some negative reactions, especially amongst feminists, who objected to what they took as the suppressive sexual politics of the male narrator. American humanities professor Camille Paglia, for example, reports that her admiration and defence of "Under My Thumb" marked the beginning of a rift between her and the radical feminists of the late 1960s. Jagger later reflected on the track in a 1995 interview with Rolling Stone: "It's a bit of a jokey number, really. It's not really an anti-feminist song any more than any of the others... Yes, it's a caricature, and it's in reply to a girl who was a very pushy woman".  For many years, starting with the 1969 tour, Jagger changed the references of "girl" in the lyric to "woman".

In 2021, Like a Rolling Stone Revisited: Une relecture de Dylan [A Re-reading of Dylan] by Jean-Michel Buizard—a book devoted to Bob Dylan—takes a diversion through Under My Thumb and offers a new interpretation of the song, departing from a first-degree reading of it. Buizard describes that in the blues tradition, of which the Stones are the heirs, the guitar is the eternal companion of the bluesman, sometimes even personified, such as Lucille, B.B. King's guitar, to which he dedicated a song (Lucille, 1968). He argues that Under My Thumb extends this tradition: "It's never about a real woman, but simply about this instrument that the guitarist has to tame, which probably gets him into trouble at first, but which he finally manages to dominate with his fingertips—under his thumb!"

Commercial performance 
According to the Associated Press and United Press International, "Under My Thumb" was among the most popular songs that the Stones performed during their 1969 appearances at Madison Square Garden and The Forum.

Critical reception 
Writing for the Port Angeles Evening News in 1971, critic Randy Peters considered "Under My Thumb" to be a "Stone's classic". In a 1978 retrospective review, music critic John Andrew Prime noted "Under My Thumb" for having "certain twists and turns" which rescued it from "the doldrums". That same year, staff writer Terry Orme wrote for the Salt Lake Tribune that the song reflected the Stones "at their offensive best", stating that the Stones had made important commentary "on the mentality of a culture". Writing for The Boston Globe in 1969, contributing critic William Alford referred to the song as being about "joyously insecure revenge". 

An article in the Courier-Journal in 1971 considered the song among the "worst picture[s] of women...where sexual exploitation reaches unique heights." Writing for the Lincoln Gazette in 1972, musician Dave Downing noted the concerns raised but considered stereotyping and oversimplification to be "very difficult to avoid" in rock music, calling "Under My Thumb" a "piece of art, not a political doctrine".

Personnel

According to authors Philippe Margotin & Jean-Michel Guesdon:

The Rolling Stones
 Mick Jagger vocals
 Keith Richards acoustic guitar, lead guitar, fuzz bass
 Brian Jones marimba
 Bill Wyman bass
 Charlie Watts drums

Additional musicians
 Ian Stewart piano
 Unidentified musician(s) finger snaps, hand claps

Altamont incident

The song was being played during the death of Meredith Hunter at the infamous Altamont Free Concert in 1969. Visibly rattled by the violence in front of the stage, Jagger can be heard to sing, “I pray that it’s all right,” instead of the usual “It feels all right.” The Stones were just finishing up the song when a fight broke out between Hells Angels on the security detail and concert-goers, ultimately culminating in the stabbing of Hunter by Hells Angel Alan Passaro after Hunter pulled out a gun.

It is a common misconception that Hunter was stabbed while the band was playing "Sympathy for the Devil". The events appear in the film Gimme Shelter.

Cover versions 
"Under My Thumb" has been the subject of multiple cover versions, some of which have charted in the US and UK. The song was subject to covers by Del Shannon and Wayne Gibson in 1966. Shannon's version reached number 129 on the Billboard Bubbling Under Hot 100 chart. Gibson's version failed to chart in 1966, but later charted at number 17 in the UK in 1974 after gaining popularity in the Northern Soul scene. In response to the Rolling Stones' Redlands bust in 1967, The Who recorded a cover version of "Under My Thumb". American singer and actress Tina Turner covered "Under My Thumb" for her 1975 album Acid Queen. It was released on United Artists Records as the fourth and last single in Australia to promote her Australian tour in 1977. Produced by Danny Diante and Spencer Proffer, the single reached No. 80 on the Kent Music Report.

"Under My Thumb" was also covered by The Hounds (Band) in 1979, with their rendition reaching number 110 on the Billboard Bubbling Under 100 chart. That same year, Streetheart released a disco-hybrid cover version that achieved gold single status in Canada. Social Distortion included their cover of the song as a hidden track at the end of their 1994 album, White Light, White Heat, White Trash. Sam Kinison sang his version of the song on his 1990 album, Leader of the Banned, with David Bryan on piano, Kim Bullard on keyboards, Mike Baird on drums, Rudy Sarzo on bass, and Robert Sarzo on guitar, with additional guitar solos by Dweezil Zappa.
Kim Carnes did a version of the song during an appearance on Saturday Night Live.

References

Sources

 
 
 

The Rolling Stones songs
1966 songs
Songs written by Jagger–Richards
The Who songs
Song recordings produced by Andrew Loog Oldham
1968 singles
British pop rock songs
1974 singles
Obscenity controversies in music
Decca Records singles
Del Shannon songs
Tina Turner songs
United Artists Records singles
1977 singles
Songs about revenge